Eumedonia is a Palearctic genus of butterflies in the family Lycaenidae first described by Walter Forster in 1938.

Species
Listed alphabetically:

Eumedonia annulata (Elwes, 1906) Tibet
Eumedonia astorica (Evans, 1925) Northwest Himalayas
Eumedonia eumedon (Esper, 1780) – geranium argus
Eumedonia kogistana (Grum-Grshimailo, 1888) Darvaz, Pamirs
Eumedonia lamasem (Oberthür, 1910) Tibet
Eumedonia persephatta (Alphéraky, 1881) ) Hindu Kush - Tian-Shan, Pamirs-Alai
Eumedonia privata (Staudinger, 1895) West Himalayas

References

External links

Polyommatini
Lycaenidae genera